Lentimicrobium saccharophilum is a species of bacteria.

References

Bacteroidia